The KR women's football team is the women's football division of Knattspyrnufélag Reykjavíkur (Reykjavík Football Club), commonly known as KR. It is based in the capital of Iceland, Reykjavík.

Recent History

Club honours
Icelandic Championships: 6
1993, 1997, 1998, 1999, 2002, 2003
Icelandic Cups: 4
1999, 2002, 2007, 2008
Icelandic League Cups: 4
1999, 2000, 2002, 2008
Icelandic Super Cup: 3
1994, 1995, 1997
1. deild kvenna:
2014

Current squad
 As of 4 July 2022

Managers
 Edda Garðarsdóttir (2016-2017)
 Bojana Kristín Besic (2017-2019)
 Ragna Lóa Stefánsdóttir (2019)
 Jóhannes Karl Sigursteinsson (2019-present)

References

KR
Capital Region (Iceland)
Úrvalsdeild Women clubs